Old Man's Journey is an adventure video game developed and published by Broken Rules. The game was released for Android, iOS, macOS and Windows in 2017, the Nintendo Switch and PlayStation 4 in 2018 and the Xbox One in 2019.

The game follows the trip of an old man, who starts to travel after receiving a letter containing some news. Throughout the game, some semi-still flashbacks explain the past life of the man.

Gameplay

The player controls an old man using the mouse, clicking where they want him to move (tapping on mobile). To allow the character to progress, the player must click and drag hillocks (swipe on mobile) to modify the landscape, adjusting their height - except where the man is standing - within a certain limit. When the edges of the hillocks fit, the old man may then pass from one to the other - even if one is in the foreground and the other is in the background. Sometimes, additional items are part of the puzzles (such as sheep), which must be moved to let the old man pass. The old man conducts his journey on foot for the most part, but other means of transport are sometimes used. In this case, the player may need to solve some environmental puzzles to allow them to progress. At times, the old man will sit down to rest, and the player must find an item in the scenery that will trigger a memory in him, initiating a flashback and allowing the player to progress. Much of the old man's story is told through these flashbacks, which consist of short, single-shot animations (such as a man looking at a house in the rain) and eschew dialogue altogether.

Reception

The game received "generally favorable" reviews, according to Metacritic, a video game review aggregator.

Accolades

References

Further reading

External links
 

2017 video games
Adventure games
Android (operating system) games
IOS games
MacOS games
Puzzle video games
Video games about old age
Video games developed in Austria
Games financed by Indie Fund
Windows games
Nintendo Switch games
PlayStation 4 games
Xbox One games
Apple Design Awards recipients